The Vanishing Hotel Room (also known as The Vanishing Lady) is an urban legend which claims that during an international exposition in Paris, a daughter left her mother in a hotel room and when she came back her mother was gone and the hotel staff claimed to have no knowledge of the missing woman.

Legend 
According to the legend, a woman was taken ill while traveling in a foreign country with her daughter. While she lay down in her hotel bed, the daughter made a trip across town to pick up a needed prescription. When she returned, she found that both her mother and the hotel room that they stayed in had disappeared. No one remembered having seen either her or her mother.

Origin 
According to the Quote Investigator website and Bonnie Taylor-Blake, the author of the earliest known instance of the legend was Nancy Vincent McClelland who wrote a version in an article titled "A Mystery of the Paris Exposition" in The Philadelphia Inquirer dated November 14, 1897—in this version, at the end the daughter is told the truth by a french policeman about her mother's death from disease. The QI and Taylor-Blake also found a version of the legend in the Detroit Free Press in 1898 titled "Porch Tales: The Disappearance of Mrs. Kneeb", which designated Kenneth Herford as the author. It is theorised that "Kenneth Herford" was a pen name for Karl Harriman.

Variations 
There are multiple variations of the "Vanishing Hotel Room" story. Usually, the story is set in Paris, France, during the Paris Exposition of 1889 or 1900, where, most commonly, a woman with her daughter have just traveled. Sometimes the women in the story aren't related; they're traveling companions of roughly the same age, and on rare occasions, both the searcher and the one sought after are male. Usually, the daughter gets sent to a mental hospital, where she spends rest of her days. In the version printed in the July 6 and July 13, 1929, issue of The New Yorker, it was revealed that the mother had died of Black Plague and the hotel management and the police had kept her death a secret so that the visitors to the city would not leave.

In popular culture 
The story inspired several novels: The End of Her Honeymoon by Marie Belloc Lowndes (1913), She Who Was Helena Cass by Lawrence Rising (1920), The Vanishing Of Mrs. Fraser by Basil Thomson (1925) and The Torrents of Spring by Ernest Hemingway (1926), as well as following films: The Midnight Warning (1932), The Lady Vanishes (1938), Covered Tracks (1938), So Long at the Fair (1950), Into Thin Air/The Lady Vanishes Alfred Hitchcock Presents (1955); The Forgotten (2004) and Flightplan (2005). It was also featured as a "true story" in a 2002 episode of the Fox television program Beyond Belief: Fact or Fiction''.

References 

American legends
Urban legends
Paris in fiction